Jutland, known anciently as the Cimbric or Cimbrian Peninsula (or), is a peninsula of Northern Europe that forms the continental portion of Denmark and part of northern Germany. The names are derived from the Jutes and the Cimbri, respectively.

Jutland's geography is flat, similar to the rest of Denmark, with comparatively steep hills in the east and a barely noticeable ridge running through the center. West Jutland is characterised by open lands, heaths, plains, and peat bogs, while East Jutland is more fertile with lakes and lush forests. Southwest Jutland is characterised by the Wadden Sea, a large unique international coastal region stretching through Denmark, Germany, and the Netherlands.

Geography 

Jutland is a peninsula bounded by the North Sea to the west, the Skagerrak to the north, the Kattegat and Baltic Sea to the east, and Germany to the south. Geographically and historically, Jutland comprises the regions of South Jutland (historically also Slesvig), West Jutland, East Jutland (including Djursland) and North Jutland (including Himmerland, Vendsyssel, Hanherred, and Thy). Since the mid-20th century, it has also become common to designate an area called Central Jutland (Midtjylland), but its definition varies. There are several historical subdivisions and regional names, and some are encountered today. They include Nørrejyllland (an historical name for the whole area north of South Jutland, and not identical with Nordjylland), Sydvestjylland, Sydjylland (the southernmost stretch of Nørrejylland, as opposed to the more southern Sønderjylland), Nordvestjylland, Kronjylland, and others. Politically, Jutland currently comprises the three contemporary Danish Administrative Regions of North Jutland Region, Central Denmark Region and the Region of Southern Denmark, along with portions of the German state of Schleswig-Holstein.

The northernmost part of Jutland is separated from the mainland by the Limfjord, a narrow stretch of water bisecting the peninsula from coast to coast. The Limfjord was formerly a long brackish water inlet, but the February flood of 1825 created a coast to coast connection. This area is called the North Jutlandic Island, Vendsyssel-Thy (after its districts) or simply Jutland north of the Limfjord; it is only partly coterminous with the North Jutland Region.

The islands of Læsø, Anholt, and Samsø in Kattegat, and Als at the rim of the Baltic Sea, are administratively and historically tied to Jutland, although the latter two are also regarded as traditional districts of their own. Inhabitants of Als, known as Alsinger, would agree to be South Jutlanders, but not necessarily Jutlanders.

The Danish Wadden Sea Islands and the German North Frisian Islands stretch along the southwest coast of Jutland in the German Bight.

Danish portion 

The largest cities in the Danish section of Jutland are as follows:
Aarhus
Aalborg
Esbjerg
Randers
Kolding
Horsens
Vejle
Herning
Silkeborg
Fredericia

Aarhus, Silkeborg, Billund, Randers, Kolding, Horsens, Vejle, Fredericia and Haderslev, along with a number of smaller towns, make up the suggested East Jutland metropolitan area, which is more densely populated than the rest of Jutland, although far from forming one consistent city.

Administratively, Danish Jutland comprises three of the five regions of Denmark, namely Nordjylland, Midtjylland, and the western half of Southern Denmark (which includes Funen). The five administrative regions came into effect on 1 January 2007, following a structural reform.

German portion 

The southern third of the peninsula is made up of the German Bundesland of Schleswig-Holstein. The German parts are usually not seen as Jutland proper, but often described more abstract as part of the Jutlandic Peninsula, Cimbrian Peninsula or Jutland-Schleswig-Holstein.

Schleswig-Holstein has two historical parts: the former duchies of Schleswig (a Danish fief) and Holstein (a German fief), both of which have passed back and forth between Danish and German rulers. The last adjustment of the Danish–German border followed the Schleswig Plebiscites in 1920 and resulted in Denmark regaining Northern Schleswig ( or more commonly today: Sønderjylland).

The historic southern border of Jutland was the river Eider, which forms the border between the former duchies of Schleswig and Holstein, as well as the border between the Danish and German realms from  850 to 1864. Although most of Schleswig-Holstein is geographically part of the peninsula, most German residents there would not identify themselves with Jutland or even as Jutlanders, but rather with Schleswig-Holstein.

The medieval law Code of Jutland applied to Schleswig until 1900, when it was replaced by the Prussian Bürgerliches Gesetzbuch (Civil Code). Some rarely used clauses of the Jutlandic Code still apply north of the Eider.

Cities 
The largest cities in the German area of the Jutland Peninsula are:
 Hamburg
 Kiel
 Lübeck
 Flensburg

Geology 

Geologically, the Mid Jutland Region and the North Jutland Region as well as the Capital Region of Denmark are located in the north of Denmark which is rising because of post-glacial rebound.

Some circular depressions in Jutland may be remnants of collapsed pingos that developed during the Last Ice Age .

History 

Jutland has historically been one of the three lands of Denmark, the other two being Scania and Zealand. Before that, according to Ptolemy, Jutland or the Cimbric Chersonese was the home of Teutons, Cimbri, and Charudes.

Many Angles, Saxons and Jutes migrated from Continental Europe to Great Britain starting around 450 AD. The Angles gave their name to the new emerging kingdoms called England (i.e., "Angle-land"). The Kingdom of Kent in south east England is associated with Jutish origins and migration, also attributed by Bede in the Ecclesiastical History. This is also supported by the archaeological record, with extensive Jutish finds in Kent from the fifth and sixth centuries.

Saxons and Frisii migrated to the region in the early part of the Christian era. To protect themselves from invasion by the Christian Frankish emperors, beginning in the 5th century, the pagan Danes initiated the Danevirke, a defensive wall stretching from present-day Schleswig and inland halfway across the Jutland Peninsula.

The pagan Saxons inhabited the southernmost part of the peninsula, adjoining the Baltic Sea, until the Saxon Wars in 772–804 in the Nordic Iron Age, when Charlemagne violently subdued them and forced them to be Christianised. Old Saxony was politically absorbed into the Carolingian Empire and Abodrites (or Obotrites), a group of Wendish Slavs who pledged allegiance to Charlemagne and who had for the most part converted to Christianity, were moved into the area to populate it. Old Saxony was later referred to as Holstein.

In medieval times, Jutland was regulated by the Law Code of Jutland (Jyske Lov). This civic code covered the Danish part of the Jutland Peninsula, i.e., north of the Eider (river), Funen as well as Fehmarn. Part of this area are now in Germany.

During the industrialisation of the 1800s, Jutland experienced a large and accelerating urbanisation and many people from the countryside chose to emigrate. Among the reasons was a high and accelerating population growth; in the course of the century, the Danish population grew two and a half times to about 2.5 million in 1901, with a million people added in the last part of the 1800s. This growth was not caused by an increase in the fertility rate, but by better nutrition, sanitation, hygiene, and health care services. More children survived, and people lived longer and healthier lives. Combined with falling grain prices on the international markets because of the Long Depression, and better opportunities in the cities due to an increasing industrialisation, many people in the countryside relocated to larger towns or emigrated. In the later half of the century, around 300,000 Danes, mainly unskilled labourers from rural areas, emigrated to the US or Canada. This amounted to more than 10% of the then total population, but some areas had an even higher emigration rate. In 1850, the largest Jutland towns of Aalborg, Aarhus and Randers had no more than about 8,000 inhabitants each; by 1901, Aarhus had grown to 51,800 citizens.

To speed transit between the Baltic and the North Sea, canals were built across the Jutland Peninsula, including the Eider Canal in the late 18th century, and the Kiel Canal, completed in 1895 and still in use.

In 1825, a severe North Sea storm on the west coast of Jutland breached the isthmus of Agger Tange in the Limfjord area, separating the northern part of Jutland from the mainland and effectively creating the North Jutlandic Island. The storm breach of Agger Tange created the Agger Channel, and another storm in 1862 created the Thyborøn Channel close by. The channels made it possible for ships to shortcut the  Skagerrak Sea. The Agger Channel closed up again over the years, due to natural siltation, but the Thyborøn Channel widened and was fortified and secured in 1875.

World War I and Battle of Jutland 
Denmark was neutral throughout the First World War. However, Danes living in North Slesvig, since it was part of the German Empire from 1864 to 1920, were conscripted for the imperial German army. 5000 Danish South Jutlanders are estimated to have fallen in German military service during the War.

The 1916 Battle of Jutland was fought in the North Sea west of Jutland as one of the largest naval battles in history. In this pitched battle, the British Royal Navy engaged the Imperial German Navy, leading to heavy casualties and losses of ships on both sides. The British fleet sustained greater losses, but remained in control of the North Sea, so in strategic terms, most historians regard Jutland either as a British victory or as indecisive. The battle is commemorated and explained at the Sea War Museum Jutland in Thyborøn.

World War II 

Denmark had declared itself neutral, but was invaded and occupied by Nazi Germany within a few hours on 9 April 1940. Scattered fighting took place in South Jutland and in Copenhagen. Sixteen Danish soldiers were killed.

Some months before the invasion, Germany had considered only occupying the northern tip of Jutland with Aalborg airfield, but Jutland as a whole was soon regarded as of high strategic importance. Work commenced on extending the Atlantic Wall along the entire west coast of the peninsula. Its task was to resist a potential allied attack on Germany by landing on the west coast of Jutland. The Hanstholm fortress at the northwestern promontory of Jutland became the largest fortification of Northern Europe. The local villagers were evacuated to Hirtshals. Coastal areas of Jutland were declared a military zone where Danish citizens were required to carry identity cards, and access was regulated.

The small Danish airfield of Aalborg was seized as one of the first objects in the invasion by German paratroopers. The airfield was significantly expanded by the Germans in order to secure their traffic to Norway, and more airfields were built. Danish contractors and 50,000–100,000 workers were hired to fulfill the German projects. The alternative for workers was to be unemployed or sent to work in Germany. The fortifications have been estimated to be the largest construction project ever performed in Denmark at a cost of then 10 billion kroner, or 300-400 billion DKK today (45-60 billion USD or 40-54 billion euro in 2019). The Danish National Bank was forced to cover most of the cost. After the war, the remaining German prisoners of war were recruited to perform extensive mine clearance of 1.4 million mines along the coast.

Many of the seaside bunkers from World War II are still present at the west coast. Several of the fortifications in Denmark have been turned into museums, including Tirpitz Museum in Blåvand, Bunkermuseum Hanstholm, and  Hirtshals Bunkermuseum.

In Southern Jutland, parts of the German minority openly sided with Germany and volunteered for German military service. While some Danes initially feared a border revision, the German occupational force did not pursue the issue. In a judicial aftermath after the end of the war, many members of the German minority were convicted, and German schools were confiscated by Danish authorities. There were some instances of Danish mob attacks against German-minded citizens. In December 1945, the remaining part of the German minority issued a declaration of loyalty to Denmark and democracy, renouncing any demands for a border revision.

Culture 

Up until the industrialisation of the 19th century, most people in Jutland lived a rural life as farmers and fishers. Farming and herding have formed a significant part of the culture since the late Neolithic Stone Age, and fishing ever since humans first populated the peninsula after the last Ice Age, some 12,000 years ago.

The local culture of Jutland commoners before industrial times was not described in much detail by contemporary texts. It was generally viewed with contempt by the Danish cultural elite in Copenhagen who perceived it as uncultivated, misguided or useless.

While the peasantry of eastern Denmark was dominated by the upper feudal class, manifested in large estates owned by families of noble birth and an increasingly subdued class of peasant tenants, the farmers of Western Jutland were mostly free owners of their own land or leasing it from the Crown, although under frugal conditions. Most of the less fertile and sparsely populated land of Western Jutland was never feudalised. East Jutland was more similar to Eastern Denmark in this respect. The north–south ridge forming the border between the fertile eastern hills and sandy western plains has been a significant cultural border until this day, also reflected in differences between the West and East Jutlandic dialect.

When the industrialisation began in the 19th century, the social order was upheaved and with it the focus of the intelligentsia and the educated changed as well. Søren Kierkegaard (1818–1855) grew up in Copenhagen as the son of a stern and religious West Jutlandic wool merchant who had worked his way up from a frugal childhood. The very urban Kierkegaard visited his sombre ancestral lands in 1840, then a very traditional society. Writers like Steen Steensen Blicher (1782-1848) and H.C. Andersen (1805–1875) were among the first writers to find genuine inspiration in local Jutlandic culture and present it with affection and non-prejudice. Blicher was himself of Jutish origin and, soon after his pioneering work, many other writers followed with stories and tales set in Jutland and written in the homestead dialect. Many of these writers are often referred to as the Jutland Movement, artistically connected through their engagement with public social realism of the Jutland region. The Golden Age painters also found inspiration and motives in the natural beauty of Jutland, including P. C. Skovgaard, Dankvart Dreyer, and art collective of the Skagen Painters. Writer Evald Tang Kristensen (1843-1929) collected and published extensive accounts on the local rural Jutlandic folklore through many interviews and travels across the peninsula, including songs, legends, sayings and everyday life.

Peter Skautrup Centret at Aarhus University is dedicated to collect and archive information on Jutland culture and dialects from before the industrialisation. The centre was established in 1932 by Professor in Nordic languages Peter Skautrup (1896-1982).

With the railway system, and later the automobile and mass communication, the culture of Jutland has merged with and formed the overall Danish national culture, although some unique local traits are still present in some cases. West Jutland is often claimed to have a mentality of self-sustainment, a superior work ethic and entrepreneurial spirit as well as slightly more religious and socially conservative values, and there are other voting patterns than in the rest of Denmark.

Dialect 

The distinctive Jutish (or Jutlandic) dialects differ substantially from the standard Danish language, especially those in the West Jutland and South Jutland parts. The Peter Skautrup Centre maintains and publishes an official dictionary of the Jutlandic dialects. Dialect usage, although in decline, is better preserved in Jutland than in eastern Denmark, and Jutlander speech remains a stereotype among many Copenhageners and eastern Danes.

Musicians and entertainers Ib Grønbech and Niels Hausgaard, both from Vendsyssel in Northern Jutland, use a distinct Jutish dialect.

In the southernmost and northernmost parts of Jutland, there are associations striving to conserve their respective dialects, including the North Frisian language-speaking areas in Schleswig-Holstein.

Literature
In the Danish part of Jutland, literature tied to Jutland, and Jutland culture, grew significantly in the 1800s and early 1900s. That was a time when large numbers of people migrated to the towns during the industrialisation, and there was a surge of nationalism as well as a quest for social reform during the public foundation of the modern democratic national state.

Steen Steensen Blicher wrote about the Jutland rural culture of his times in the early 1800s. Through his writings, he promoted and preserved the various Jutland dialects, as in E Bindstouw, published in 1842.

Danish social realist and radical writer Jeppe Aakjær used Jutlanders and Jutland culture in most of his works, for example in Af gammel Jehannes hans Bivelskistaarri. En bette Bog om stur Folk (1911), which was widely read in its time. He also translated poems of Robert Burns to his particular Central Western Jutish dialect.

Karsten Thomsen (1837–1889), an inn-keeper in  Frøslev with artistic aspirations, wrote warmly about his homestead of South Jutland, using the dialect of his region explicitly.

Two songs are often regarded as regional anthems of Jutland: Jylland mellem tvende have ("Jutland between two seas", 1859) by Hans Christian Andersen and Jyden han æ stærk aa sej ("The Jute, he is strong and tough", 1846) by Steen Steensen Blicher, the latter in dialect.

Jutland native Maren Madsen (1872-1965) emigrated to the American town of Yarmouth, Maine, in the late 19th century. She wrote a memoir documenting the transition, From Jutland's Brown Heather to the Land Across the Sea.

Publisher Frederick William Anthoensen was born in Torland, South Jutland. He moved to the United States with his parents in 1884.

References

Sources

External links 

 
Geography of Germany
Geography of Denmark
Peninsulas of Denmark
Peninsulas of Europe
Divided regions
Peninsulas of the Baltic Sea
Peninsulas of Schleswig-Holstein